18D/Perrine–Mrkos is a periodic comet in the Solar System, originally discovered by the American-Argentine astronomer Charles Dillon Perrine (Lick Observatory, California, United States) on December 9, 1896.  For some time it was thought to be a fragment of Biela's Comet.

It was considered lost after the 1909 appearance, but was rediscovered by the Czech astronomer Antonín Mrkos (Skalnate Pleso Observatory, Slovakia) on October 19, 1955, using ordinary binoculars, it was later confirmed as 18D by Leland E. Cunningham (Leuschner Observatory, University of California, Berkeley).

The comet was last observed during the 1968 perihelion passage when it passed  from the Earth. The comet has not been observed during the following perihelion passages:
1975 Aug. 2
1982 May 16
1989 Feb. 28
1995 Dec. 6
2002 Sept.10
2009 Apr. 17
2017 Feb. 26

The next predicted perihelion passage would be on 2025-Jan-01 but the comet is currently considered lost as it has not been seen since Jan 1969.

References

External links 
 Orbital simulation from JPL (Java) / Horizons Ephemeris
 18D at Kronk's Cometography
 18D at Kazuo Kinoshita's Comets
 18D at Seiichi Yoshida's Comet Catalog
 NK 835 18D/Perrine-Mrkos – Syuichi Nakano (2002)

Periodic comets
018P
0018
Lost comets
18961209
19551019